The cabinet of Egyptian Prime Minister Sherif Ismail was formed on 19 September 2015.

Cabinet members

References

2015 establishments in Egypt
Cabinets of Egypt
Cabinets established in 2015
Cabinets disestablished in 2018